is the capital city of Aomori Prefecture, in the Tōhoku region of Japan. Aomori is one of Japan's 60 core cities and the core of the Aomori metropolitan area.

Geography

Aomori is located in central Aomori Prefecture, the northernmost prefecture of Honshu. It is located in the northeastern part of the Tsugaru region, which refers to the western half of the prefecture, and is centered on Aomori Plain, facing Aomori Bay, a branch bay of Mutsu Bay, to the north, and the Hakkōda and Higashidake Mountains, which are the northern end of the Ōu Mountains to the south to the east. Among other smaller rivers, the city has two large rivers flowing through it, the Komagome River and its tributary, the Arakawa River. Parts of the city in the southeast are within the borders of Towada-Hachimantai National Park and is a tourist destination throughout the four seasons. In the northeast is Asamushi-Natsudomari Prefectural Natural Park. There are many hot springs in the city, including Sukayu Onsen at the foot of Mt. Hakkōda and Asamushi Onsen on the coast.

Surrounding municipalities
Aomori Prefecture
Fujisaki
Goshogawara
Hirakawa
Hiranai
Itayanagi
Kuroishi
Shichinohe
Towada
Yomogita

Climate
Like most of the Tōhoku region, Aomori has a humid temperate climate with warm summers, and cold, though not extreme, winters. The city has a cold, humid continental climate (Köppen Dfa) characterized by warm, short summers and long, cold winters with heavy snowfall.

Aomori and its surrounding area are renowned for heavy snowfall, the heaviest among all Japanese cities, and, in fact, among the heaviest in the world. The particularly heavy snow is caused by several winds that collide around the city and make the air rise and cool, resulting in quick, thick cloud formation followed by intense precipitation.

In summer, a cool wind called "Yamase" often blows from the east, which sometimes results in abnormally cool weather and poor harvests. Additionally, thick fogs from the Oyashio Current are often observed in mountainous areas in the summer. Due to this fog, flights to Aomori Airport are often cancelled.

Demographics
A person living in or from Aomori is referred to as an Aomorian. Per Japanese census data, the population of Aomori has remained relatively steady over the past 40 years.

Etymology

History

Aomori literally means blue forest, although it could possibly be translated as "green forest". The name is generally considered to refer to a small forest on a hill which existed near the town. This forest was often used by fishermen as a landmark. A different theory suggests the name might have been derived from the Ainu language.

The area has been settled extensively since prehistoric times, and numerous Jōmon period sites have been found by archaeologists, the most famous being the Sannai-Maruyama Site located just southwest of the city center dating to 5500–4000 BC, and the Komakino Site slightly farther south dating to around 4000 BC. The large scale of these settlements revolutionized theories on Jōmon period civilization. During the Heian period, the area was part of the holdings of the Northern Fujiwara clan, but remained inhabited by the Emishi people well into the historic period. After the fall of the Northern Fujiwara in the Kamakura period, the territory was part of the domain assigned to the Nambu clan, and into the Sengoku period, it came under the control of the rival Tsugaru clan, whose main castle was located in Namioka. After the start of the Edo period, what would become the core of present-day Aomori was a minor port settlement in the Hirosaki Domain called . The town was rebuilt in 1626 under orders of the daimyō, Tsugaru Nobuhira and renamed "Aomori", but this name did not come into common use until after 1783; however, the historical accuracy of this claim is debated since there is no written material from the time to definitively connect Utō to Aomori. Some evidence even claims that Aomori and Utō co-existed in different parts the city in its current state. It was not until 1909 that a local scholar claimed that the village of Utō became Aomori.

After the Meiji Restoration, the feudal domains were abolished and replaced with prefectures, of which a total of six were initially created in the territory of modern Aomori Prefecture. These were merged into the short-lived Hirosaki Prefecture in July 1871. However, due to the historic enmity between the former Tsugaru territories in the west and the former Nambu territories in the east, the prefectural capital was relocated from Hirosaki to the more centrally-located Aomori immediately after the merger and the prefecture was renamed Aomori Prefecture on 23 September 1871. However, the municipality of Aomori was not given town status within Higashitsugaru District until 1 April 1889, with the establishment of the modern municipalities system. It was later designated as a city on 1 April 1898.

The Hokkaidō Colonization Office began operations of a ferry service from Aomori to Hakodate in Hokkaido from 1872. In September 1891, Aomori was connected with Tokyo by rail with the opening of the Tōhoku Main Line. The Ōu Main Line running along the Sea of Japan coast opened in December 1894. The development of modern Aomori was primarily due to its prefectural capital status and the singular importance as the terminus of these rail lines and the Seikan Ferry, which officially opened in 1908. The 8th Division of the Imperial Japanese Army were stationed in Aomori from 1896. In the winter of 1902, 199 of 210 soldiers on a military cold-weather readiness exercise perished while attempting to cross the Hakkōda Mountains from Aomori to Towada in what was later called the Hakkōda Mountains incident.

Much of the town burned down in a large fire on 3 May 1910. The port facilities were expanded in 1924, and the city received its first bus services in 1926. Japan Air Transport began scheduled air services from 1937.

Towards the final stages of World War II, on the night of 28–29 July 1945, Aomori was subject to an air raid as part of the strategic bombing campaign waged by the United States against military and civilian targets and population centers during the Japan home islands campaign. The 28–29 July bombing claimed 1,767 lives and destroyed 88% of the city.

In the post-war period, Aomori was rebuilt as the local political and commercial center. The Tsugaru Line railway opened between Aomori Station and Kanita Station in 1951. Aomori Airport was opened in 1964 in nearby Namioka. The city was connected to Tokyo by highway in 1979 with the opening of the Tōhoku Expressway. Construction began on a new airport within the city of Aomori in 1982. Aomori's landmark pyramidal Aomori Prefecture Tourist Center opened in 1986. The new airport was completed on 19 July 1987. On 1 October 2002, Aomori was proclaimed a core city, granting it an increased level of local autonomy.

On 1 April 2005, Aomori absorbed the town of Namioka to create the new and expanded city of Aomori; but lost a portion of Namioka to the town of Fujisaki (from Minamitsugaru District) on 1 September 2007.

Government
Aomori has a mayor-council form of government with a directly elected mayor and a unicameral city legislature of 35 members. The city also contributes 10 members of the 48 member Aomori Prefectural Assembly. In terms of national politics, the city falls within the Aomori 1st district, a single-member constituency of the House of Representatives in the national Diet of Japan, which also includes the city of Mutsu, the Higashitsugaru District, the Shimokita District, and the northern half of the Kamikita District.

Economy
Aomori serves as the regional commercial center for central Aomori Prefecture. Agriculture and commercial fishing form only 4% of the city economy, with manufacturing forming 16.2% and the service sector forming 78.2%.

Education
Aomori is the only prefectural capital in Japan which has no national university, instead, nearby Hirosaki became the site for the prefecture's highest educational facility. The city has 45 public elementary schools and 19 public junior high schools operated by the city government, as well as two private junior high schools. The city has 10 public high schools operated by the Aomori Prefectural Board of Education and three private high schools. The prefecture also operates eight special education schools for the handicapped.

Universities and colleges
Aomori Public University
Aomori University of Health and Welfare
Aomori University
Aomori Chuo Gakuin University
Aomori Akenohoshi Junior College
Aomori Chuo Junior College

High schools
Aomori Prefectural Aomori High School
Aomori Prefectural Aomori Chūō High School
Aomori Prefectural Aomori Higashi High School
Aomori Prefectural Aomori Kita High School
Aomori Prefectural Aomori Hokuto High School
Aomori Prefectural Aomori Kōgyō High School
Aomori Prefectural Aomori Minami High School
Aomori Prefectural Aomori Nishi High School
Aomori Prefectural Aomori Shōgyō High School
Aomori Prefectural Aomori Toyama High School
Aomori Akenohoshi High School
Aomori Yamada High School
Tōō Gakuen High School

Junior high schools
Aburakawa Junior High School
Arakawa Junior High School
Asamushi Junior High School
Furukawa Junior High School
Higashi Junior High School
Kita Junior High School
Koda Junior High School
Minami junior High School
Namioka Junior High School
Namiuchi Junior High School
Nishi Junior High School
Okidate Junior High School
Sannai Junior High School
Shinjo Junior High School
Takada Junior High School
Toyama Junior High School
Tsukuda Junior High School
Tsukurimichi Junior High School
Tsutsui Junior High School
Uramachi Junior High School
Yokouchi Junior High School

Transportation

Airport
Aomori Airport - (established in 1964 with international flights from 1995) is about a 35-minute drive from the city center, with a bus service available. There are daily flights to Tokyo, Osaka, Nagoya and Sapporo. There are also international flights to Seoul–Incheon and Tianjin.

Railways
Aomori Station has been the main station of the city since 1891. The two trunk lines of the Tōhoku region, the Tōhoku Main Line (now the Aoimori Railway) and the Ōu Main Line, terminated at Aomori Station and continued to Hakodate by the Seikan Ferry. In 1988, Seikan Tunnel replaced the ferry's role as the connector of Honshu and Hokkaido's rail networks, but the station still functioned as the connecting point between main line trains and trains for the Aomori-Hakodate section.

The Tōhoku Shinkansen opened in 2010 with a new terminal at Shin-Aomori Station.
 East Japan Railway Company (JR East) – Tōhoku Shinkansen 

 JR East – Ōu Main Line
 -  -  -  -  - 
 JR East – Tsugaru Line
Aomori -  -  -  -  -  - 
 Aoimori Railway Line
Aomori -  -  -  -  -

Highways
 – Namioka Interchange – Aomori Interchange
 – Aomori Interchange – Aomori-chūō Interchange – Aomori-higashi Interchange

 – Namioka Interchange

Aomori Belt Highway
Aomori West Bypass
 (unsigned)

Seaports
Port of Aomori – The Seikan Ferry and Tsugaru Kaikyō Ferry operates ferries to Hakodate. It takes about four hours to go by ferry from Aomori to Hakodate. From 1908 to 1988 the ferry served as the primary transport between the island of Honshū and the northern island of Hokkaido. In March 1988, the Seikan Tunnel opened up, traveling under the Tsugaru Strait, this quickly replaced the slow-moving ferry as the primary transportation between the two islands.

Sports
Aomori has hosted several international curling events, two in 2003 (including the Asian Winter Games), and the local women's "Team Aomori" was selected to represent Japan at the 2006 Winter Olympics in Turin, Italy and at the 2010 Winter Olympics in Vancouver, British Columbia, Canada. From 17 to 25 March 2007, Aomori hosted the World Women's Curling Championships.

Sports facilities
Aomori City Baseball Stadium, otherwise known as Gappo Park Stadium
Aomori Stadium
Aomori Velodrome

Parks and recreation
Gappo Park is Aomori's oldest public park and its most iconic green space. Located to the east of the center of the city, it contains a public beach, water gardens, various ornamental trees, and the Aomori City Baseball Stadium. Other parks in the city include the centrally-located Aoimori Park and Aoimori Central Park.

Local attractions

Aomori Nebuta Matsuri is a famous festival performed from 2–7 August annually and is listed as one of the 100 Soundscapes of Japan by the Japanese Ministry of the Environment. Besides this, major attractions of Aomori include ruins, museums, and mountains. The Hakkōda Mountains have good locations for trekking with hot spas (onsen), such as Sukayu Onsen.

Aomori Bay Bridge
Aomori City Forestry Museum
Aomori City History and Folk Arts Museum
Aomori Museum of Art
Aomori Prefectural Museum
Asamushi Aquarium
Asamushi Onsen
Komakino Site, a National Historic Site
Munakata Shiko Memorial Museum of Art
Namioka Castle ruins, A National Historic Site
Nebuta Museum Wa Rasse
Ōmori Katsuyama Site, a National Historic Site
Sannai-Maruyama Site, a Special National Historic Site 
Seiryū-ji
Shinmachi Street
Sukayu Onsen
Takayashikidate Site, a National Historic Site
Uramachi Shinmeigū

Sister city relations
 – Hakodate, Hokkaido – since 1989. Aomori and Hakodate share a "twin cities" relationship referred to as the "Seikan Economic and Cultural Area".
 – Kecskemét, Bács-Kiskun County, Hungary – since August 1994
 – Pyeongtaek, Gyeonggi-do, South Korea – since 1995
 – Dalian, Liaoning, People's Republic of China – since December 2004
 – Hsinchu County, Taiwan – friendship city since October 2014

Notable people from Aomori
Noriko Awaya, singer
Takaharu Furukawa, archer
Takanori Hatakeyama, professional boxer
Yuji Hayami, science-fiction writer
Shigeru Izumiya, entertainer
Yaho Kitabatake, children's fiction writer
Ichirō Kojima, photographer
Ibuki Kido, voice actress
Daimaou Kosaka, comedian
Daisuke Matsuzaka, baseball player
Keizo Miura, skier
Yuichiro Miura, skier
Shiko Munakata, woodblock artist
Ren Narita, professional wrestler
Hitoshi Saito, judoka
Kyoichi Sawada, photographer
Akimitsu Takagi, crime fiction writer
Bushuyama Takashi, sumo wrestler
Kiyoshi Tanabe, professional boxer
Shūji Terayama, modern artist
Takanosato Toshihide, sumo wrestler
Daigo Umehara, professional fighting game player
Ryushi Yanagisawa, professional wrestler and mixed martial artist
Akiko Yano, singer-songwriter

References

External links

 

 
Cities in Aomori Prefecture
Port settlements in Japan
Populated coastal places in Japan
Aomori metropolitan area
1898 establishments in Japan